The European Union Institute for Security Studies (EUISS) is a Paris-based agency of the European Union (EU) within the realm of Common Foreign and Security Policy (CFSP). The EUISS is an autonomous agency with full intellectual freedom and researches security issues of relevance for the EU and provides a forum for debate. In its capacity as an EU agency, it also offers analyses and forecasting to the High Representative for Foreign Affairs and Security Policy, Josep Borrell.

History
It evolved from Western European Union Institute for Security Studies (est. 1960) following a gradual transfer of powers from the Western European Union (WEU) to the EU.

Activities

Mission
According to the Council Joint Action of 20 July 2001, which established the EUISS, the mission of the EUISS is to 'contribute to the development of the CFSP, in particular the CSDP, in coherence with the European Security Strategy. To that end, it shall conduct academic research and policy analysis, organise seminars and carry out information and communication activities in that field. The institute's work shall inter alia contribute to the transatlantic dialogue. It shall involve a network of exchanges with other research institutes and think-tanks both inside and outside the European Union'.

Oversight and Funding
According to the European External Action Service (EEAS) website the institute is funded by member states of the European Union, according to a GNP-based cost-sharing formula, and governed by:
the Political and Security Committee (PSC), which exercises political supervision; and the Board, which lays down budgetary and administrative rules and approving the institute's work programme (chaired by the HR/VP Josep Borrell).

Research
The EUISS researches topics related to the Common Foreign and Security Policy (CFSP), including the Common Security and Defence Policy (CSDP). The Institute therefore covers EU relations with the following regions:
Africa, Asia, Middle East, Russia and eastern neighbours, Transatlantic relations and Latin America, and Western Balkans.

In addition to these geographical regions, the EUISS addresses the thematic areas of counter-terrorism, migration, non-proliferation, conflict prevention, crisis management, global governance, EU enlargement, cybersecurity, justice and home affairs, and defence industries.

Outreach
Communications and outreach activities are central to the work of the EUISS in fulfilling its mission to contribute to Europe's strategic debate. The EUISS maintains a strong online presence (website re-launched in 2017) and distributes its research via a regular newsletter. Making use of social media tools, the EUISS maintains active Facebook and Twitter accounts, as well as Flickr and LinkedIn channels.

European Strategy and Policy Analysis System
In 2011, the EUISS, in its role as the European agency for strategic studies, was chosen by the European Commission to prepare and deliver the final reports of the European Strategy and Policy Analysis System (ESPAS).

See also

Chaillot Papers
Common Foreign and Security Policy
European Defence Agency
European External Action Service
European Union Satellite Centre
Joint European Union Intelligence School
List of think tanks
Western European Union
European Security and Defence College

References

External links
 
 The European Strategy and Policy Analysis System (ESPAS)
 CSDP structure, instruments, and agencies, EEAS website

Security studies
Institute for Security Studies
Political and economic think tanks based in France
2001 establishments in France
2001 in the European Union
Government agencies established in 2001
Organizations based in Paris
European integration think tanks